Diploderma kangdingense, the Kangding mountain lizard, is a species of lizard in the family Agamidae. The species is endemic to China.

References

Diploderma
Lizards of Asia
Reptiles of China
Endemic fauna of China
Reptiles described in 2022